

Eurobasket 2011 roster
Complete roster of the team for Eurobasket 2011 in Lithuania:

Main roster

|}
| valign="top" |
 Head coach

 Assistant coach(es)

 Athletic trainer

Legend
(C) Team captain
Club field describes current pro club
|}

Depth chart

Preparation matches
Note: All times are UTC+2

Eurobasket 2011
Note: All times are local

Preliminary round

Second round

Knockout stage

Quarterfinals

Classification 5–8

Fifth place game

References

Lithuania
2011
Eurobasket